The R. Perry Turner House is located in Greer, South Carolina. The Classical Revival style house was built in 1937 for prominent local businessman Richard Perry Turner. The house was designed by Greenville-based architect William Riddle Ward, commissioned after Turner saw the house designed by Ward for his younger brother, Robert Gibbs Turner.

The brick house on a poured concrete foundation is almost 10,000 square feet in size. A brick garage, stable and octagonal brick summer house in the backyard were also designed by Ward for the property.

References

Greer, South Carolina
National Register of Historic Places in Greenville County, South Carolina
Colonial Revival architecture in South Carolina
Houses completed in 1937
Houses in Greenville County, South Carolina
Houses on the National Register of Historic Places in South Carolina